Khamar-e Qalandaran (also Romanized as Khamār-e Qalandarān; also known as Khamār) is a village in Faramarzan Rural District, Jenah District, Bastak County, Hormozgan Province, Iran. At the 2006 census, its population was 118, in 22 families.

References 

Populated places in Bastak County